The 1909–10 Irish Cup was the 30th edition of the premier knock-out cup competition in Irish football. 

Distillery won the tournament for the 9th time, defeating Cliftonville 1–0 in the final.

Results

Quarter-finals

|}

1 After a protest about the state of the pitch a replay was ordered.

Replays

|}

Semi-finals

|}

Final

References

External links
 Northern Ireland Cup Finals. Rec.Sport.Soccer Statistics Foundation (RSSSF)

Irish Cup seasons
1909–10 domestic association football cups
1909–10 in Irish association football